The 1936 United States Senate election in Mississippi was held on November 3, 1936. Incumbent Democratic U.S. Senator Pat Harrison was re-elected to a fourth term in office.

Because Harrison faced no opposition in the general election, his victory in the August 25 primary was tantamount to election.

Democratic primary

Candidates
Martin S. Conner, Governor of Mississippi
Frank S. Harper
Pat Harrison, incumbent Senator since 1919

Results

General election

Results

See also 
 1936 United States Senate elections

Notes

References 

1936
MIssissippi
1936 Mississippi elections